The women's 3000 metres walk event at the 1985 IAAF World Indoor Games was held at the Palais Omnisports Paris-Bercy on 18 January.

Results

References

3000
Racewalking at the IAAF World Indoor Championships